The Teatro Tacón (Tacón Theatre)  opened in 1838 in Havana, Cuba. Its auditorium contained 2,750 seats. In 1847 Bottesini's opera Cristoforo Colombo premiered there. By 1855, so many people attended events that the city issued parking regulations for carriages on performance nights.

Architecture
The Teatro Tacón had excellent acoustics, so much so that the Gran Teatro de La Habana was built around its old hall. Architect Paul Belau and U.S. firm Purdy and Henderson, Engineers kept the original structure and built the Centro Gallego (Galician Center), a European-styled addition and renovation for the purpose of enlarging its functions as well as serving as a means of introducing an elaborate system of circulation into an otherwise simple, and architecturally modest, preexisting box.

Gallery

References

Bibliography
  
  (+ Theater programs, p. 657-660)

See also
Gran Teatro de La Habana
Paseo del Prado, Havana
Plaza del Vapor, Havana

Buildings and structures in Havana
Neoclassical architecture in Cuba
Theatres in Havana
Concert halls in Cuba
Opera houses in Cuba
Theatres completed in 1838
1830s establishments in Cuba
19th-century architecture in Cuba